Hot Country Songs and Country Airplay are charts that rank the top-performing country music songs in the United States, published by Billboard magazine.  Hot Country Songs ranks songs based on digital downloads, streaming, and airplay not only from country stations but from stations of all formats, a methodology introduced in 2012.  Country Airplay, which was published for the first time in 2012, is based solely on country radio airplay, a methodology which had previously been used for several decades for Hot Country Songs.  In 2018, three different songs topped the Hot Country Songs chart and 33 different songs topped Country Airplay.

The Country Airplay chart began the year with "Like I Loved You" by Brett Young holding the top position, while "Meant to Be" by Bebe Rexha and Florida Georgia Line held the number one spot on Hot Country Songs, continuing a run that had begun on the chart dated December 16, 2017.  When "Meant to Be" spent an eleventh week in the top spot in February, it overtook Taylor Swift's "We Are Never Ever Getting Back Together" as the longest-running number one song on the chart for a lead female artist.  In August, the song spent a 35th consecutive week in the top spot and broke the record previously held by 2017's "Body Like a Back Road" by Sam Hunt for the most weeks at number one on the chart.  "Meant to Be" ultimately held the top spot on the Hot Country Songs listing until the issue of Billboard dated November 24, 2018, when it was replaced at number one after 50 weeks by "Lose It" by Kane Brown.  This was the second number one for Brown after "What Ifs", which had coincidentally ended Hunt's then-record run the previous year. The longest-tenured number one single on Country Airplay in 2018 was "She Got the Best of Me" by Luke Combs, with four weeks spent at the top.

Several artists achieved their first career number ones by virtue of topping the Country Airplay chart in 2018.  Russell Dickerson had his first number one with "Yours" on the chart dated January 27, Scotty McCreery with "Five More Minutes" on the chart dated March 3, Jordan Davis with "Singles You Up" on the chart dated April 21,  Morgan Wallen with "Up Down" on June 30, and Jimmie Allen with "Best Shot" on November 24.  "Best Shot" also made Allen the second African-American country artist to reach number one with a debut single, ten years after Darius Rucker topped Hot Country Songs with his first single.  In the issue of Billboard dated December 15, Allen's song became the first since 2008 to drop from number one and then regain the top spot on a chart based on country radio airplay.  In addition, Maren Morris had her first solo number-one single with "I Could Use a Love Song" on the chart dated January 20, after having previously topped the chart as a featured artist on Thomas Rhett's "Craving You" in July 2017, and Chris Stapleton and Bebe Rexha reached the number one spot on Country Airplay for the first time, having previously topped Hot Country Songs.   In June, David Lee Murphy had his first chart-topping single for more than 20 years when "Everything's Gonna Be Alright", a duet with Kenny Chesney, topped the airplay-based chart.  Murphy had last achieved a number one with "Dust on the Bottle" in 1995.

Chart history

Notes
a.  Due to a change in Billboards chart dating policy, the first chart of 2018 was dated January 3, four days after the previous one, and another chart was released dated January 6.

See also
2018 in music
List of artists who reached number one on the U.S. country chart
List of number-one country albums of 2018 (U.S.)

References

2018
Number-one country singles
United States Country Singles